Portugal competed at the 2017 World Aquatics Championships in Budapest, Hungary from 14 July to 30 July.

Open water swimming

Portugal has entered two open water swimmers

Swimming

Portuguese swimmers have achieved qualifying standards in the following events (up to a maximum of 2 swimmers in each event at the A-standard entry time, and 1 at the B-standard):

Men

Women

Synchronized swimming

Portugal's synchronized swimming team consisted of 3 athletes (3 female).

Women

 Legend: (R) = Reserve Athlete

References

Nations at the 2017 World Aquatics Championships
Portugal at the World Aquatics Championships
2017 in Portuguese sport